The Acrobat is a Canadian drama film, directed by Rodrigue Jean and released in 2019. The film centres on Christophe (Sébastien Ricard) and Micha (Yury Paulau), two men who meet in an unoccupied unit in a high-rise construction project in Montreal during a snowstorm, and begin a passionate love affair in which they regularly meet back at the same unit.

The film, which borrows its initial narrative setup from the film Last Tango in Paris, is the third in Jean's trilogy of films exploring sexuality and emotional intimacy, following Lost Song and Love in the Time of Civil War.

The film premiered at the 2019 Vancouver International Film Festival, was subsequently screened at the Festival du nouveau cinéma, and had its commercial release in February 2020.

References

External links
 

2019 films
2019 drama films
2019 LGBT-related films
Canadian drama films
Canadian LGBT-related films
2010s French-language films
Films directed by Rodrigue Jean
LGBT-related drama films
Films set in Montreal
Gay-related films
French-language Canadian films
2010s Canadian films